This is a list of animated package films. There are two types of package films — a film with little or no new animation; usually there is only new bridge animation to link older theatrical/TV shorts together, for example Daffy Duck's Quackbusters. The other type has all-new animation and might not always feature bridge animation. Melody Time doesn't feature bridge animation, but The Three Caballeros does. Home video releases of older theatrical and TV shorts or TV series are usually released as compilations and might therefore be thought of as packaged, but are usually not considered as such.

See also 

 Lists of animated feature films

References

 
Package